Claire Schapira (born 19 January 1946) is a French harpsichordist, pianist and composer.

Biography
Born in Paris, Schapira studied piano, harpsichord, musical theater and composition, graduating from the Schola Cantorum de Paris. She was a resident at the Villa Medici in Rome and served an internship at Ircam. She received a grant from the French Ministry of Culture in 1985 to write the opera La Partition de sable. Her work has been performed internationally.

Works
Selected works include:

La Partition de sable, opera
Trames
Vagues
Ténèbres
Fragments insolites
Le Ciel de mes yeux en pleurs
Acheminement
Mémorial
Requiem pour la paix (commissioned by Radio France)
La Chaîne (1981)
Chant cousu (1985)
Rumeur (1986)
Regards (RAI National Symphony Orchestra)
In pace
Interjections II (Festival de Paris)
Contes (Musica and the Salzburg Festival)
Hymne à la paix
Antigone
Sans craindre le vertige et le vent'''Chants mêlésSysipheCassandreStabat Mater (with the support of the Beaumarchais Foundation)L'Ombre de Cassandre'', opera

References

1946 births
Living people
Musicians from Paris
20th-century classical composers
French classical composers
French women classical composers
French opera composers
Women opera composers
20th-century French women musicians
20th-century French composers
20th-century women composers
French harpsichordists
20th-century French women classical pianists